Blue Origin NS-19 was a crewed New Shepard sub-orbital spaceflight mission operated by Blue Origin that launched on 11 December 2021. The flight was scheduled to launch on 9 December 2021, later delayed to 11 December 2021.

The mission patch of the flight also featured the initials of Glen de Vries who died in a plane crash a month after flying on Blue Origin's previous crewed flight NS-18.

Crew 
The NS-19 crew was nicknamed the "Original Six".

The crew of six included Laura Shepard Churchley, daughter of the first U.S. astronaut in space, as well the namesake for the New Shepard spaceflight program, Alan Shepard, and Michael Strahan, a Hall of Fame former New York Giants defensive end, as well as a co-anchor of Good Morning America and analyst for Fox NFL Sunday; both as guests of Blue Origin. Paying passengers included executive Dylan Taylor, investor Evan Dick,  Bess Ventures founder Lane Bess and his child, Cameron. The latter became the first parent and child on the same spaceflight. Cameron Bess became the youngest American at age 23 and the first pansexual person and the first member of the furry fandom to fly to space.

References 

 
 

Space tourism
2021 in spaceflight
Test spaceflights
Aviation history of the United States
Suborbital human spaceflights
2021 in Texas
2021 in aviation
December 2021 events in the United States
New Shepard missions